Raghunath Singh Anjana ( – 7 January 2020) was an Indian politician from Madhya Pradesh belonging to Bharatiya Janata Party. He was a legislator of the Madhya Pradesh Legislative Assembly.

Biography
Anjana was elected as a legislator of the Madhya Pradesh Legislative Assembly from Jaora in 1990. He beat then Home Minister of the Government of Madhya Pradesh Bharat Singh in the election. He also contested from this constituency in 1993 but did not win. 

Anjana died on 7 January 2020 at the age of 75.

References

1940s births
2020 deaths
Bharatiya Janata Party politicians from Madhya Pradesh
Madhya Pradesh MLAs 1990–1992
People from Ratlam district